Allobates myersi (common name: Myers' poison frog) is a species of frog in the family Aromobatidae found in Amazonian Colombia, likely also in adjacent Brazil and northeastern Peru.
Its natural habitat is tropical moist lowland forest. It is terrestrial and diurnal, and lays its eggs in the leaf-litter. In the southern part of its range, it is threatened by habitat loss.

References

myersi
Amphibians of Colombia
Endemic fauna of Colombia
Taxonomy articles created by Polbot
Amphibians described in 1981